Acaulidae is a family of cnidarians belonging to the order Anthoathecata.

Genera:
 Acaulis Stimpson, 1853
 Acauloides Bouillon, 1965
 Blastothela Verrill, 1878
 Cryptohydra Thomas, Edwards & Higgins, 1995

References

 
Aplanulata
Cnidarian families